Moil may refer to:

Places
 Moil Castle, Argyll and Bute, Scotland
 Moil, Northern Territory, Australia

Other
 MOIL, Indian ore mining company
 Moil or Ngan'gi language